Alberto Lleras Camargo Airport  is a high-elevation airport  southwest of the city of Sogamoso in the Boyacá Department of Colombia.

The airport and city lie in a broad valley between two north–south ridges of the eastern Colombian Andes mountains. The Sogamoso non-directional beacon (Ident: SOG) is located on the field.

See also

Transport in Colombia
List of airports in Colombia

References

External links
OpenStreetMap - Sogamoso
OurAirports - Sogamoso
SkyVector - Sogamoso
Camargo Airport

Airports in Colombia